The 1916 All-Western college football team consists of American football players selected to the All-Western teams chosen by various selectors for the 1916 college football season.

All-Western selections

Ends
 Bert Baston, Minnesota (ECP-1) (CFHOF)
 Chic Harley, Ohio State (ECP-1) (CFHOF)
 Frederick I. Norman, Northwestern (ECP-2)
 Charles Bolen, Ohio State (ECP-2)

Tackles
 George Hauser, Minnesota (ECP-1)
 Fred Becker, Iowa (ECP-1)
 Manley R. Petty, Illinois (ECP-2)
 Frank A. R. Mayer, Minnesota (ECP-2)

Guards
 Charles Higgins, Chicago (ECP-1)
 Gilbert S. Sinclair, Minnesota (ECP-1)
 Conrad L. Eklund, Minnesota (ECP-2)
 Charlie Bachman, Notre Dame (ECP-2) (CFHOF)

Centers
 John L. Townley, Jr., Minnesota (ECP-1)
 Walter Niemann, Michigan (ECP-2)

Quarterbacks
 Bart Macomber, Illinois (ECP-1) (CFHOF)
 Claire Long, Minnesota (ECP-2)

Halfbacks
 Paddy Driscoll, Northwestern (ECP-1) (CFHOF/PFHOF)
 John Maulbetsch, Michigan (ECP-1) (CFHOF)
 Hal Hansen, Minnesota (ECP-2)
 Stan Cofall, Notre Dame (ECP-2)

Fullbacks
 Pudge Wyman, Minnesota (ECP-1)
 Bob Koehler, Northwestern (ECP-2)

Key
Bold = consensus choice by a majority of the selectors

ECP = E. C. Patterson in Collier's Weekly

CFHOF = College Football Hall of Fame

See also
1916 College Football All-America Team
1916 All-Western Conference football team

References

1916 Western Conference football season
All-Western college football teams